The Plaza de toros México, situated in Mexico City, is the world's largest bullring. This 41,262-seat facility is usually dedicated to bullfighting, but many boxing matches have been held there as well, including Julio César Chávez's third bout with Frankie Randall. The Plaza México replaced the ancient bullring Toreo de la Condesa in the Condesa neighborhood that was overwhelmed by the rapid growth of population in the capital. It opened on 5 February 1946 and annually since then, that date marks the date of the Corrida de Aniversario. This building was built beside the football stadium Estadio Ciudad de los Deportes (formerly Estadio Azul).

References

Mexico
Sports venues in Mexico City
Benito Juárez, Mexico City